La Prairie Center is an unincorporated community in La Prairie Township, Marshall County, Illinois, United States.

References

Unincorporated communities in Marshall County, Illinois
Unincorporated communities in Illinois
Peoria metropolitan area, Illinois